The Bandit is a 1946 Italian drama film directed by  Alberto Lattuada and starring Anna Magnani, Amedeo Nazzari and Carla Del Poggio. It was shot on location in Turin. Nazzari won the Nastro d'Argento as Best Actor for his performance. The film was entered into the 1946 Cannes Film Festival.

Plot
A contingent of Italian prisoners of war arrive on a train from Germany after World War II to Turin. The city where Ernesto (played by Nazzari) lives has been bombed, his mother is dead and his sister has gone missing. State help for returning veterans is scant and bureaucracy rampant. Ernesto tries to get an honest job, but fails. After finding a lost purse and meeting the dangerously seductive Lidia (played by Anna Magnani), Ernesto discovers the whereabouts of his lost sister (played by Carla del Poggio), who has turned to prostitution to survive during the war years. He unwittingly causes her death, kills her pimp, escapes capture with Lidia's help and joins her gangster band.

Cast
Anna Magnani	as 	Lidia
Amedeo Nazzari	as 	Ernesto
Carla Del Poggio	as 	Maria
Carlo Campanini	as 	Carlo
Eliana Banducci	as 	Rosetta
Mino Doro	as 	Mirko
Folco Lulli	as 	Andrea
 Mario Perrone as 	Il gobbo
 Amato Garbini as Il tenutario
 Gianni Appelius as 	Signorina
 Ruggero Madrigali as 	Il negriero 
 Thea Aimaretti as Tecla, la padrona
 Alessandro Tedeschi as 	Stefano Albertini

References

Bibliography
 Gundle, Stephen. Fame Amid the Ruins: Italian Film Stardom in the Age of Neorealism. Berghahn Books, 2019.
 Reeves, Nicholas. The Power of Film Propaganda: Myth or Reality?. Continuum, 2003.

External links
 

1946 films
Italian World War II films
1940s Italian-language films
Films set in Italy
1946 crime drama films
Italian black-and-white films
Social realism in film
Films directed by Alberto Lattuada
Films set in Turin
Films shot in Turin
Lux Film films
Italian crime drama films
1940s Italian films